Biomagnification, also known as bioamplification or biological magnification, is the increase in concentration of a substance, e.g a pesticide, in the tissues of organisms at successively higher levels in a food chain. This increase can occur as a result of:
 Persistence – where the substance cannot be broken down by environmental processes
 Food chain energetics – where the substance's concentration increases progressively as it moves up a food chain 
 Low or non-existent rate of internal degradation or excretion of the substance – mainly due to water-insolubility

Biological magnification often refers to the process whereby  substances such as pesticides or heavy metals work their way into lakes, rivers and the ocean, and then move up the food chain in progressively greater concentrations as they are incorporated into the diet of aquatic organisms such as zooplankton, which in turn are eaten perhaps by fish, which then may be eaten by bigger fish, large birds, animals, or humans. The substances become increasingly concentrated in tissues or internal organs as they move up the chain. Bioaccumulants are substances that increase in concentration in living organisms as they take in contaminated air, water, or food because the substances are very slowly metabolized or excreted.

Processes
Although sometimes used interchangeably with "bioaccumulation", an important distinction is drawn between the two, and with bioconcentration.
 Bioaccumulation occurs within a trophic level, and is the increase in the concentration of a substance in certain tissues of organisms' bodies due to absorption from food and the environment.
 Bioconcentration is defined as occurring when uptake from the water is greater than excretion.
Thus, bioconcentration and bioaccumulation occur within an organism, and biomagnification occurs across trophic (food chain) levels.

Biodilution is also a process that occurs to all trophic levels in an aquatic environment; it is the opposite of biomagnification, thus when a pollutant gets smaller in concentration as it progresses up a food web.

Many chemicals that bioaccumulate are highly soluble in fats (lipophilic) and insoluble in water (hydrophobic). Lipophilic substances cannot be diluted, broken down, or excreted in urine, a water-based medium, and so accumulate in fatty tissues of an organism, if the organism lacks enzymes to degrade them. When eaten by another organism, fats are absorbed in the gut, carrying the substance, which then accumulates in the fats of the predator. Since at each level of the food chain there is a lot of energy loss, a predator must consume many prey, including all of their lipophilic substances.

For example, though mercury is only present in small amounts in seawater, it is absorbed by algae (generally as methylmercury). Methylmercury is one of the most harmful mercury molecules. It is efficiently absorbed, but only very slowly excreted by organisms. Bioaccumulation and bioconcentration result in buildup in the adipose tissue of successive trophic levels: zooplankton, small nekton, larger fish, etc. Anything which eats these fish also consumes the higher level of mercury the fish have accumulated. This process explains why predatory fish such as swordfish and sharks or birds like osprey and eagles have higher concentrations of mercury in their tissue than could be accounted for by direct exposure alone. For example, herring contains mercury at approximately 0.01 parts per million (ppm) and shark contains mercury at greater than 1 ppm.

DDT is a pesticide known to biomagnify, which is one of the most significant reasons it was deemed harmful to the environment by the EPA and other organizations. DDT is one of the least soluble chemicals known and accumulates progressively in adipose tissue, and as the fat is consumed by predators, the amounts of DDT biomagnify. A well known example of the harmful effects of DDT biomagnification is the significant decline in North American populations of predatory birds such as bald eagles and peregrine falcons due to DDT caused eggshell thinning in the 1950s. DDT is now a banned substance in many parts of the world.

Current status 
In a review, a large number of studies, Suedel et al. concluded that although biomagnification is probably more limited in occurrence than previously thought, there is good evidence that DDT, DDE, PCBs, toxaphene, and the organic forms of mercury and arsenic do biomagnify in nature. For other contaminants, bioconcentration and bioaccumulation account for their high concentrations in organism tissues. More recently, Gray reached a similar substances remaining in the organisms and not being diluted to non-threatening concentrations. The success of top predatory-bird recovery (bald eagles, peregrine falcons) in North America following the ban on DDT use in agriculture is testament to the importance of recognizing and responding to biomagnification.

Substances that biomagnify 
Two common groups that are known to biomagnify are chlorinated hydrocarbons, also known as organochlorines, and inorganic compounds like methylmercury or heavy metals. Both are lipophilic and not easily degraded. Novel organic substances like organochlorines are not easily degraded because organisms lack previous exposure and have thus not evolved specific detoxification and excretion mechanisms, as there has been no selection pressure from them. These substances are consequently known as "persistent organic pollutants" or POPs.

Metals are not degradable because they are chemical elements. Organisms, particularly those subject to naturally high levels of exposure to metals, have mechanisms to sequester and excrete metals. Problems arise when organisms are exposed to higher concentrations than usual, which they cannot excrete rapidly enough to prevent damage. Persistent heavy metals, such as lead, cadmium, mercury, and arsenic, can have a wide variety of adverse health effects across species.

Novel organic substances 

 DDT (dichlorodiphenyltrichloroethane)
 Hexachlorobenzene (HCB)
 PCBs (polychlorinated biphenyls)
 Toxaphene
 Monomethylmercury.

See also
 Mercury in fish
 Methylmercury
 Dichlorodiphenyldichloroethylene
 Toxaphene

References

External links
 Fisk AT, Hoekstra PF, Borga K,and DCG Muir, 2003. Biomagnification. Mar. Pollut. Bull. 46 (4): 522-524

Ecotoxicology
Pollution